Sunnyside–Central Terrace Historic District is a national historic district located at Winston-Salem, Forsyth County, North Carolina.  The district encompasses 425 contributing buildings in a predominantly residential section of Winston-Salem.  The buildings date from about 1892 to 1958, and include notable examples of Colonial Revival, Late Victorian, and Bungalow / American Craftsman style architecture.  Notable buildings include the Arista Mills (1950), Farmers Cooperative Exchange (c. 1945), Southern Steel Stampings (c. 1945), E. T. Baity Oil Co. (c. 1940), Central Terrace Methodist Church (1925, 1957), and Pine Chapel Moravian Church (1928).

It was listed on the National Register of Historic Places in 2008.

References

Historic districts on the National Register of Historic Places in North Carolina
Colonial Revival architecture in North Carolina
Victorian architecture in North Carolina
Buildings and structures in Winston-Salem, North Carolina
National Register of Historic Places in Winston-Salem, North Carolina